Zayarthiri Stadium is a multi-use stadium in Naypyidaw, Myanmar. It has a capacity of 30,000 spectators. Having been completed in 2012, it is used mostly for football and athletics competitions. It also hosted men's football tournament for the 2013 Southeast Asian Games. It was built along with Zabuthiri Stadium.

References

Football venues in Myanmar
Buildings and structures in Naypyidaw
Sports venues completed in 2012